See Jhalawar for namesakes
Jhalawar(zalawad) was the northernmost of the four prants (traditional regions) into which the many feudal units (mostly petty princely states) of Kathiawar on Saurashtra peninsula in present Gujarat (western India) were divided, the others being Halar (west), Gohelwar (southeast) and Sorath (south).

Its salute states were :
 First Class : dhrangadhra state ,title of maharajadhiraj maharana sahib ,Hereditary salute of 13 guns before independence the take 15 gun salute. wankaner state, title of maharana sahib,hereditary salute of 11 guns 
 Second Class : 
 Limbdi State, title Thakore Sahib, Hereditary salute of 9-guns
 Wadhwan State, title Maharana, Hereditary salute of 9-guns

Its main non-salute states included this all state rule under the jhala rajputs :
 Third Class : Chuda State, Lakthar State, Sayla State
 Fourth Class : Bajana State, Muli State, Patdi State
 Fifth Class : Vanod State
 Sixth Class : Anandpur State, Bhoika State, Chotila State, Dasada State, Rai-Sankli State, Rakpur State, Sanosra State, Vadod State

Other petty states, often a single village: Ankevalia, Bamanbore, Bhadvana, Bhalala, Bhalgamda, Bharejda, Bhathan, Bhimora, Chachana, Chhalala, Chobari, Darod State, Devlia, Dudhrej, Gedi State, Gundiali, Jakhan State, Jamar State, Jhampodad, Jhinjhuvada, Kamalpur, Kantharia, Karmad, Karol State, Kesria, Khambhlav, Khandia, Kherali, Laliyad, Matra Timba, Mevasa, Munjpur, Palali State, Rajpur (Jathiawar), Ramparda, Sahuka, Samla, Sejakpur, Sudamda-Dhandalpur, Talsana, Tavi State, Untdi, Vana State, Vanala, Vithalgadh, and Vadekhan

External links
 Imperial Gazetteer, on dsal.uchicago.edu - Kathiawar

Princely states of Gujarat